The Central District of Saravan County is a district (bakhsh) in Saravan County, Sistan and Baluchestan province, Iran. At the 2006 census, its population was 97,055, in 17,549 families. At the 2016 census, its population had risen to 132,746. The district has three cities: Saravan, Gosht, and Mohammadi. The district has three rural districts (dehestan): Gosht Rural District, Howmeh Rural District, and Nahuk Rural District.

References 

Saravan County
Districts of Sistan and Baluchestan Province
Populated places in Saravan County